Sarcinula may refer to:

 Sarcinula, an extinct genus of marine invertebrates in the class Anthozoa
 Sarcinula, a synonym for a genus of orchids, Specklinia